Wanderland is the second studio album by American singer Kelis. It was released on October 17, 2001, by Virgin Records. The album's only single, "Young, Fresh n' New", peaked at number 32 on the UK Singles Chart. As of October 2004, Wanderland had sold 17,000 copies in the United Kingdom.

Background and release
According to Kelis, Virgin Records did not understand Wanderland. She subsequently left the label around the time of the album's European release, and as a result, the album was not released in the United States. Wanderland was officially released in the US to digital retailers on May 31, 2019, and to streaming services on June 5.

The song "Flash Back" (retitled "Flashback") was included on Kelis' subsequent album Tasty, while a new version of "Popular Thug", which replaced Pusha T of Clipse with Nas, appears on The Neptunes' 2003 compilation album Clones.

Critical reception

Wanderland received generally positive reviews from music critics. The Guardian critic Alexis Petridis described the music as "clever, exhilarating and original" and praised the album as The Neptunes' "most adventurous work to date". Mark Bautz of Entertainment Weekly commented that "Kelis' brash blend of Curtis Mayfield soul, techno-Zeppelin funk, Jobim-lite bossa nova, and ultrasmooth R&B shows a more coherent artistry than many recent boundary-busting experiments." Rupert Howe of Blender found that "[t]he best thing about Wanderland is that [Kelis] seems finally to have begun celebrating her eccentricities", adding, "Aside from the idiosyncratic lyrics [...] she switchbacks from parodying '70s mack-stylin' (the Funkadelic 'Daddy') to an '80s soul croon ('Scared Money')." At entertainment.ie, Andrew Lynch commended Kelis' "aggressive vocal delivery and intriguing, if sometimes confusing lyrical imagery", while calling the album itself "[b]rilliantly produced" and "strikingly original".

Rolling Stones Barry Walters noted that, musically, Wanderland "doesn't venture far from its predecessor, Kaleidoscope: The Neptunes are still matching jaunty beats to techno sonics. But her pen is busier now, and the result is smarter, more nuanced but no less confrontational." Andy Kellman of AllMusic stated that "the album's first three songs—'Young, Fresh n' New,' 'Flash Back,' and 'Popular Thug'—are on an even standing with the best of the singer's debut [...] After that solid beginning, the album continually loses steam and gains it back." Stephen Dalton of NME viewed the album as "a solid sophomore effort", but felt that "there is way too much filler here for a hotly hyped alterna-soul princess with her eyes on the big prize." Sal Cinquemani of Slant Magazine opined that the album is "far from rote, but the Neptunes's rehashed retro beats and synths are beginning to sound derivative of Britney Spears's 'I'm a Slave 4 U.' Much of the disc's hooks are unchallenging and repetitive at best." In The New Rolling Stone Album Guide (2004), Ernest Hardy and Arion Berger were critical of the album, writing that "[t]he beats that brought Kaleidoscope to life are gone, and only Kelis' hippieish and overly self-aware songwriting remains."

Track listing

Notes
 "Easy Come, Easy Go" contains replayed elements from "Eazy-Duz-It" by Eazy-E.
 "Little Suzie" contains two hidden tracks: "Star Wars" and a cover of "I Don't Care Anymore" by Phil Collins.

Personnel
Credits adapted from the liner notes of Wanderland.

Musicians
 Kelis – vocals
 The Neptunes – instruments, arrangements
 Tony Kanal – bass guitar 
 Tom Dumont – guitar 
 Adrian Young – drums 
 Fieldy – live bass 
 C Minus – scratches

Technical
 The Neptunes – production, executive production
 Andrew Coleman – engineering 
 Brian Garten – engineering 
 Ken "Duro" Ifill – mixing 
 Serban Ghenea – mixing 
 Rob Walker – executive production

Artwork
 Michelle Laurita – cover photography
 Pauline St. Denis – inside photography

Charts

Release history

Notes

References

2001 albums
Albums produced by the Neptunes
Kelis albums
Virgin Records albums